The My Big Fat Greek Wedding franchise, consists of American romantic comedies, including two theatrical films, and a television series.

The two films grossed $457.1 million worldwide against a $23 million combined budget. The first film received positive reviews from critics, while the second film received mostly negative reviews.

A third film is in production at Universal Pictures' division Focus Features.

Films

My Big Fat Greek Wedding (2002)

Everyone in the Portokalos family worries about Toula (Nia Vardalos). Still unmarried at 30 years old, she works at Dancing Zorba's, the Greek restaurant owned by her parents, Gus (Michael Constantine) and Maria (Lainie Kazan). After taking a job at her aunt's travel agency, she falls in love with Ian Miller (John Corbett), a teacher who is tall, handsome, and definitely not Greek. Toula isn't sure which will be more upsetting to her father, that Ian is a foreigner or that he's a vegetarian. The film was a sleeper hit, and the film became the highest-grossing romantic comedy of all time. The film grossed $241 million domestically for a worldwide total of  $368 million, despite not reaching No. 1 at the box office, against a $5 million budget. The film was nominated for an Academy Award for Best Original Screenplay at the 75th Academy Awards.

My Big Fat Greek Wedding 2 (2016)

Ten years after the first film, parenting and marriage is becoming tougher and tougher for Toula (Nia Vardalos) and her husband Ian (John Corbett). Not only has their relationship lost some of its spark, but they're also dealing with a rebellious teenage daughter who clashes with Greek traditions. On top of that, Toula must contend with aging parents and the endless need of cousins and friends. But when a shocking family secret comes to light, the entire Portokalos clan makes plans to come together for an even bigger wedding than before. The film was less successful than the original, grossing $59 million domestically, with a $88 million worldwide gross, against an $18 million budget.

My Big Fat Greek Wedding 3 (2023) 
In late June 2016, Nia Vardalos hinted at the possibility of a third film, saying that although no writing has been done, she does have an idea. On April 8, 2021, it was announced that My Big Fat Greek Wedding 3 was in development, to be written by Vardalos as an independent film, who will also reprise her role as co-star. The project was also revealed to have been delayed by the COVID-19 pandemic, in which production will commence once the studios maintains insurance for its crew, with principal photography scheduled to take place in Greece. On October 1, 2021, Vardalos confirmed that the script for the third film had been completed and that it would involve another Greek wedding. On May 15, 2022, it was announced that filming will take place throughout Greece in the summer of 2022, with large portions being shot on Corfu from July 5 to August 3, 2022. The film will be dedicated to the memory of Michael Constantine, who died on August 31, 2021 at the age of 94. In June 2022, Vardalos was announced to serve as director, with a script that she wrote. Principal photography commenced in Athens, Greece on June 22, 2022 and wrapped on August 10, 2022. The project will be a joint-venture production between Playtone, Gold Circle Films, HBO Films, and Focus Features. The film is scheduled to be released on September 8, 2023.

Television

The film inspired the short-lived television spin-off My Big Fat Greek Life (2003). Most of the major characters were played by the same actors, with the exception of John Corbett being replaced by Steven Eckholdt.

The show received poor reviews from critics noting the random character entrances and serious plot "adjustments" that did not match the film. The seven episodes from the series are available on DVD from Sony Pictures Home Entertainment, whose TV studio division produced the show.

Primary cast and characters

Additional crew and production detail

Reception

Box office performance

Critical and public response

References

External links
 
 
 
 
 
 
 
 

Film series introduced in 2002
Film franchises
Works about Greek-American culture